Lisa Angelle (born December 27, 1965, in New Orleans, Louisiana, United States) is an American country music singer-songwriter. During the 1980s and 1990s, Angelle wrote songs for several country artists including Wynonna Judd, who reached number one on the Billboard Hot Country Singles & Tracks chart in 1992 with "I Saw the Light", co-written by pop singer Andrew Gold. As a recording artist, Angelle released two singles with EMI America Records in 1985, but did not release an album until 2000 via DreamWorks Nashville. She also recorded the theme song for the CBS TV series Beauty and the Beast, which aired 1987 to 1990.

Discography

Lisa Angelle (2000)

Track listing
All songs written by Lisa Angelle and Andrew Gold except where noted. 
"4, 3, 2, 1" – 3:23
"A Woman Gets Lonely" (Angelle) – 4:23
"Kiss This" – 5:01
"I Didn't Want to Know" – 4:18
"I Wear Your Love" – 3:13
"Sin" (Lewis Anderson, Angelle) – 4:07
"Twisted" – 3:12
"Daddy's Gun" – 4:40
"Midnight Rodeo" – 4:03
"I Don't Know Why" (Angelle) – 4:09
"Sparrow" (Angelle) – 5:21

Personnel

 Lisa Angelle – lead vocals, background vocals
 Robert Bailey Jr. – background vocals
 Steve Conn – accordion
 J.T. Corenflos – electric guitar
 Dan Dugmore – steel guitar
 Stuart Duncan – fiddle
 Andrew Gold – acoustic guitar, electric guitar, keyboards, background vocals
 Vicki Hampton – background vocals
 Wes Hightower – background vocals
 John Hobbs – keyboards
 David Huff – drum programming
 Troy Johnson – background vocals
 B. James Lowry – acoustic guitar
 George Marinelli – electric guitar
 Paul Mills – bells, viola
 Steve Nathan – keyboards
 Tom Roady – percussion
 Biff Watson – acoustic guitar
 Chris Willis – background vocals
 Lonnie Wilson – drums
 Glenn Worf – bass guitar
 Paul Worley – acoustic guitar, electric guitar

Singles

Music videos

References 

American country singer-songwriters
American women country singers
Musicians from New Orleans
Living people
1965 births
DreamWorks Records artists
Singer-songwriters from Louisiana
21st-century American women singers
21st-century American singers
Country musicians from Louisiana